Naoya (written: , , ,  or ) is a masculine Japanese given name. Notable people with the name include:

, Japanese footballer
, Japanese shogi player
, Japanese actor
, Japanese photographer
, Japanese sumo wrestler
, Japanese visual artist
, Japanese footballer
, Japanese footballer
, Japanese footballer
, Japanese baseball player
, Japanese judoka, professional wrestler and mixed martial artist
, Japanese footballer
, Japanese footballer
, Japanese sprint canoeist
, Japanese footballer
, Japanese writer
, Japanese sumo wrestler
, Japanese artistic gymnast and freestyle skier
, Japanese footballer
, Japanese sculptor
, Japanese footballer
, Japanese speed skater
, Japanese swimmer
, Japanese artistic gymnast
, Japanese voice actor, actor and singer
, Japanese footballer
, Japanese singer, actor and dancer
, Japanese composer
, Japanese footballer
, Japanese composer

Japanese masculine given names